This is a list of polynomial topics, by Wikipedia page. See also trigonometric polynomial, list of algebraic geometry topics.

Terminology 

Degree: The maximum exponents among the monomials.
Factor: An expression being multiplied.
Linear factor: A factor of degree one.
Coefficient: An expression multiplying one of the monomials of the polynomial.
Root (or zero) of a polynomial: Given a polynomial p(x), the x values that satisfy p(x) = 0 are called roots (or zeroes) of the polynomial p.
Graphing
End behaviour –
Concavity –
Orientation –
Tangency point –
Inflection point – Point where concavity changes.

Basics 

Polynomial
Coefficient
Monomial
Polynomial long division
Synthetic division
Polynomial factorization
Rational function
Partial fraction
Partial fraction decomposition over R
 Vieta's formulas
Integer-valued polynomial
Algebraic equation
Factor theorem
Polynomial remainder theorem

Elementary abstract algebra 
See also Theory of equations below.
Polynomial ring
Greatest common divisior of two polynomials
Symmetric function
Homogeneous polynomial
Polynomial SOS (sum of squares)

Theory of equations

 Polynomial family
 Quadratic function
 Cubic function
 Quartic function
 Quintic function
Sextic function
Septic function
Octic function
 Completing the square
 Abel–Ruffini theorem
 Bring radical
 Binomial theorem
 Blossom (functional)
 Root of a function
 nth root (radical)
 Surd
 Square root
 Methods of computing square roots
 Cube root
 Root of unity
 Constructible number
 Complex conjugate root theorem
 Algebraic element
 Horner scheme
 Rational root theorem
 Gauss's lemma (polynomial)
 Irreducible polynomial
 Eisenstein's criterion
 Primitive polynomial
 Fundamental theorem of algebra
 Hurwitz polynomial
 Polynomial transformation
 Tschirnhaus transformation 
 Galois theory
 Discriminant of a polynomial
 Resultant
 Elimination theory
 Gröbner basis
 Regular chain
 Triangular decomposition
 Sturm's theorem
 Descartes' rule of signs
 Carlitz–Wan conjecture
 Polynomial decomposition, factorization under functional composition

Calculus with polynomials

Delta operator
Bernstein–Sato polynomial

Polynomial interpolation

Lagrange polynomial
Runge's phenomenon
Spline (mathematics)

Weierstrass approximation theorem

Bernstein polynomial

Linear algebra

Characteristic polynomial
Minimal polynomial
Invariant polynomial

Named polynomials and polynomial sequences

Abel polynomials
Actuarial polynomials
Additive polynomials
All one polynomials
Appell sequence
Askey–Wilson polynomials
Bell polynomials
Bernoulli polynomials
Bernstein polynomial
Bessel polynomials
Binomial type
Caloric polynomial
Charlier polynomials
Chebyshev polynomials
Chihara–Ismail polynomials
Cyclotomic polynomials
Dickson polynomial
Ehrhart polynomial
Exponential polynomials
Favard's theorem
Fibonacci polynomials
Gegenbauer polynomials
Hahn polynomials
Hall–Littlewood polynomials
Heat polynomial — see caloric polynomial
Heckman–Opdam polynomials
Hermite polynomials
Hurwitz polynomial
Jack function
Jacobi polynomials
Koornwinder polynomials
Kostka polynomial
Kravchuk polynomials
Laguerre polynomials
Laurent polynomial
Linearised polynomial
Littlewood polynomial
Legendre polynomials
Associated Legendre polynomials
Spherical harmonic
Lucas polynomials
Macdonald polynomials
Meixner polynomials
Necklace polynomial
Newton polynomial
Orthogonal polynomials
Orthogonal polynomials on the unit circle
Permutation polynomial
Racah polynomials
Rogers polynomials
Rogers–Szegő polynomials
Rook polynomial
Schur polynomials
Shapiro polynomials
Sheffer sequence
Spread polynomials
Tricomi–Carlitz polynomials
Touchard polynomials
Wilkinson's polynomial
Wilson polynomials
Zernike polynomials
Pseudo-Zernike polynomials

Knot polynomials

Alexander polynomial
HOMFLY polynomial
Jones polynomial

Algorithms
Karatsuba multiplication
Lenstra–Lenstra–Lovász lattice basis reduction algorithm (for polynomial factorization)
Lindsey–Fox algorithm
Schönhage–Strassen algorithm

Other 
Polynomial mapping

Mathematics-related lists
List